Tomorrow Morning may refer to:

 Tomorrow Morning (musical), musical by Laurence Mark Wythe
 Tomorrow Morning (film), 2006 Serbian film
 Tomorrow Morning (album), 2010 album by EEls
 "Tomorrow Morning", song from the Jack Johnson album, On and On
 "Tomorrow Morning", song from the Natalie Imbruglia album, Left of the Middle